Joseph "Joe" Detmer (born November 3, 1983) is an American athlete, competing in the icosathlon, decathlon and heptathlon.

Career 
In 2010, after he won the Thorpe Cup and became third at the USA national championships decathlon, Joe Detmer competed in the world championship icosathlon in Lynchburg, Virginia. At that occasion he improved the world record icosathlon to 14571 points. Some of his more remarkable performances include the 100 m in 10.93 s, 7.30 m in long jump, and 53.83 on the 400 m hurdles. He went to University of Wisconsin–Madison.

Statistics

Personal bests 
Outdoor

Indoor

Palmares

Heptathlon 
2009:  American indoor championship - 5720 p

Decathlon 
2007:  National Collegiate Athletic Association championship - 7963 p
2009:  American outdoor championship - 8009 p
2009:  Thorpe Cup - 7892 p
2010:  Thorpe Cup - 8090 p
2011:  Thorpe Cup - 7846 p

Icosathlon 
2010:  World championship - 14571 p (WR)

See also
List of world records in athletics

References

External links
 
 USATF profile for Joe Detmer

American male decathletes
Living people
World record holders in athletics (track and field)
1983 births
People from Lodi, Wisconsin
Track and field athletes from Wisconsin
Wisconsin Badgers men's track and field athletes